Garkhashab (also Romanized as Garkhashāb; also known as Garkhashāb-e ‘Abdī and Garkhashāb-e Soflá) is a village in Zirtang Rural District, Kunani District, Kuhdasht County, Lorestan Province, Iran. At the 2006 census, its population was 690, in 127 families.

References 

Towns and villages in Kuhdasht County